Eta Andromedae (Eta And, η Andromedae, η And) is a spectroscopic binary star in the constellation of Andromeda.  It consists of two G-type subgiant or giant stars orbiting each other with a period of 115.7 days and has an overall apparent visual magnitude of approximately 4.403.

History

Eta Andromedae was discovered to be a double-lined spectroscopic binary in a series of spectra taken in 1899 and 1900.  Its orbit was computed in 1946 from spectroscopic observations.  Because spectroscopy only reveals the radial velocity of a star towards or away from the viewer, such a computation does not determine all orbital elements.  In observations made from 1990 to 1992, Eta Andromedae was resolved interferometrically by the Mark III Stellar Interferometer at Mount Wilson Observatory, California, United States.  This allowed a more complete orbit to be computed and, in 1993, published.

Naming

Visual companion

Eta Andromedae has a visual companion star of apparent visual magnitude 11.5, BD+22°153B, visible 129.2 arcseconds away.

References

External links
 Image η Andromedae

Andromeda (constellation)
G-type giants
005516
Andromedae, 38
Andromedae, Eta
004463
Spectroscopic binaries
Triple stars
BD+22 0153
0271